Curcuma is a genus of plants in the family Zingiberaceae that contains such species as turmeric and Siam tulip. They are native to Southeast Asia, southern China, the Indian Subcontinent, New Guinea and northern Australia. Some species are reportedly naturalized in other warm parts of the world such as tropical Africa, Central America, Florida, and various islands of the Pacific, Indian and Atlantic Oceans. Generally, most curcuma grows well in loose and sandy soil in shaded areas.

Botanical description 

Curcuma is a perennial, herbaceous plant that can reach a height of 1 meter. It emits numerous, edible rhizomes whose interiors are yellow or orange. These rhizomes are reduced to a powder, which is the spice called  curcuma. Its lanceolate leaves are oblong or elliptical and are of a uniform green, and about 50cm long and 7 to 25 cm wide.

Uses
The name is derived from the Sanskrit kuṅkuma, referring to turmeric. Turmeric is used to flavour or colour curry powders, mustards, butters, and cheeses; it may also be used as a substitute for saffron or other yellowish pigments.

Species

Plants of the World Online currently includes:

 Curcuma aeruginosa Roxb.
 Curcuma albiflora Thwaites
 Curcuma alismatifolia Gagnep. : Siam tulip
 Curcuma amada Roxb. : mango-ginger
 Curcuma amarissima Roscoe
 Curcuma andersonii (Baker) Škornick.
 Curcuma angustifolia Roxb.
 Curcuma antinaia Chaveer. & Tanee
 Curcuma arida Škornick. & N.S.Lý
 Curcuma aromatica Salisb. : wild turmeric
 Curcuma arracanensis W.J.Kress & V.Gowda
 Curcuma attenuata Wall. ex Baker
 Curcuma aurantiaca Zijp
 Curcuma australasica Hook.f.
 Curcuma bakeriana Hemsl.
 Curcuma bella Maknoi, K.Larsen & Sirirugsa
 Curcuma bhatii (R.M.Sm.) Škornick. & M.Sabu
 Curcuma bicolor Mood & K.Larsen
 Curcuma caesia Roxb.
 Curcuma campanulata (Kuntze) Škornick.
 Curcuma candida (Wall.) Techapr. & Škornick.
 Curcuma cannanorensis R.Ansari, V.J.Nair & N.C.Nair
 Curcuma caulina J.Graham
 Curcuma ceratotheca K.Schum.
 Curcuma clovisii Škornick.
 Curcuma cochinchinensis Gagnep.
 Curcuma codonantha Škornick., M.Sabu & Prasanthk.
 Curcuma coerulea K.Schum.
 Curcuma colorata Valeton
 Curcuma comosa Roxb.
 Curcuma coriacea Mangaly & M.Sabu
 Curcuma corniculata Škornick.
 Curcuma cotuana Luu, Škornick. & H.Ð.Tran
 Curcuma decipiens Dalzell
 Curcuma ecomata Craib
 Curcuma elata Roxb.
 Curcuma euchroma Valeton
 Curcuma exigua N.Liu
 Curcuma ferruginea Roxb.
 Curcuma flammea Škornick.
 Curcuma flaviflora S.Q.Tong
 Curcuma glans K.Larsen & Mood
 Curcuma glauca (Wall.) Škornick.
 Curcuma gracillima Gagnep.
 Curcuma graminifolia (K.Larsen & Jenjitt.) Škornick.
 Curcuma grandiflora Wall. ex Baker
 Curcuma gulinqingensis N.H.Xia & Juan Chen
 Curcuma haritha Mangaly & M.Sabu
 Curcuma harmandii Gagnep.
 Curcuma heyneana Valeton & Zijp
 Curcuma inodora Blatt.
 Curcuma involucrata (King ex Baker) Škornick.
 Curcuma karnatakensis Amalraj, Velay. & Mural.
 Curcuma kayahensis Nob.Tanaka & M.M.Aung
 Curcuma kudagensis Velay., V.S.Pillai & Amalraj
 Curcuma kwangsiensis S.G.Lee & C.F.Liang
 Curcuma larsenii Maknoi & Jenjitt.
 Curcuma latiflora Valeton
 Curcuma latifolia Roscoe
 Curcuma leonidii Škornick. & Luu identified at Bu Gia Map National Park
 Curcuma leucorrhiza Roxb.
 Curcuma loerzingii Valeton
 Curcuma longa L. : turmeric - type species
 Curcuma longispica Valeton
 Curcuma macrochlamys (Baker) Škornick.
 Curcuma mangga Valeton & Zijp
 Curcuma meraukensis Valeton
 Curcuma montana Roxb.
 Curcuma mukhraniae R.Kr.Singh & Arti Garg
 Curcuma mutabilis Škornick., M.Sabu & Prasanthk.
 Curcuma myanmarensis (W.J.Kress) Škornick.
 Curcuma nankunshanensis N.Liu, X.B.Ye & Juan Chen
 Curcuma neilgherrensis Wight
 Curcuma newmanii Škornick.
 Curcuma oligantha Trimen
 Curcuma ornata Wall. ex Baker
 Curcuma pambrosima Škornick. & N.S.Lý
 Curcuma parviflora Wall.
 Curcuma parvula Gage
 Curcuma pedicellata (Chaveer. & Mokkamul) Škornick.
 Curcuma peramoena Souvann. & Maknoi
 Curcuma petiolata Roxb.
 Curcuma phaeocaulis Valeton
 Curcuma picta Roxb. ex Škornick.
 Curcuma pierreana Gagnep.
 Curcuma plicata Wall. ex Baker
 Curcuma porphyrotaenia Zipp. ex Span.
 Curcuma prakasha S.Tripathi
 Curcuma prasina Skornick.
 Curcuma pseudomontana J.Graham
 Curcuma purpurascens Blume
 Curcuma putii Maknoi & Jenjitt.
 Curcuma pygmaea Škornick. & Šída f.
 Curcuma reclinata Roxb.
 Curcuma rhabdota Sirirugsa & M.F.Newman
 Curcuma rhomba Mood & K.Larsen
 Curcuma roscoeana Wall.
 Curcuma roxburghii M.A.Rahman & Yusuf
 Curcuma rubescens Roxb.
 Curcuma rubrobracteata Škornick., M.Sabu & Prasanthk.
 Curcuma sahuynhensis Škornick. & N.S.Lý
 Curcuma saraburiensis Boonma & Saensouk
 Curcuma sattayasaiorum Chaveer. & Sudmoon
 Curcuma scaposa (Nimmo) Škornick. & M.Sabu
 Curcuma sessilis Gage
 Curcuma sichuanensis X.X.Chen
 Curcuma singularis Gagnep.
 Curcuma sparganiifolia Gagnep.
 Curcuma stenochila Gagnep.
 Curcuma strobilifera Wall. ex Baker
 Curcuma sumatrana Miq.
 Curcuma supraneeana (W.J.Kress & K.Larsen) Škornick.
 Curcuma sylvatica Valeton
 Curcuma thorelii Gagnep.
 Curcuma tongii Y.H.Tan & Li X.Zhang
 Curcuma trichosantha Gagnep.
 Curcuma vamana M.Sabu & Mangaly
 Curcuma viridiflora Roxb.
 Curcuma vitellina Škornick. & H.Ð.Tran
 Curcuma wallichii M.A.Rahman & Yusuf
 Curcuma wilcockii M.A.Rahman & Yusuf
 Curcuma woodii N.H.Xia & Juan Chen
 Curcuma xanthella Škornick.
 Curcuma yingdeensis N.H.Xia & Juan Chen
 Curcuma yunnanensis N.Liu & S.J.Chen
 Curcuma zanthorrhiza Roxb. : temu lawak
 Curcuma zedoaria (Christm.) Roscoe : zedoary
 Curcuma zedoarioides Chaveer. & Tanee

References

Gallery

 
Zingiberaceae genera
Taxa named by Carl Linnaeus